12th Nova Scotia general election may refer to:

Nova Scotia general election, 1820, the 12th general election to take place in the Colony of Nova Scotia, for the 12th General Assembly of Nova Scotia
1911 Nova Scotia general election, the 34th overall general election for Nova Scotia, for the (due to a counting error in 1859) 35th Legislative Assembly of Nova Scotia, but considered the 12th general election for the Canadian province of Nova Scotia